Manasukkul Mathappu is a 1988 Indian Tamil-language film written and directed by Robert–Rajasekar. The film stars Prabhu, Saranya and Lissy, with Sarath Babu and Senthamarai in supporting roles. It is a remake of the 1986 Malayalam film Thalavattam which was inspired by the 1975 film One Flew Over the Cuckoo's Nest  which in turn was an adaptation of the 1962 novel One Flew Over the Cuckoo's Nest by Ken Kesey. The film was released on 24 June 1988 and Prabhu won the Cinema Express Award for Best Actor – Tamil.

Plot 

Shekar becomes mentally ill after his girlfriend Anita dies because of an electric short circuiting accident during a rock concert. He is admitted into an institution managed authoritatively by Nagaraj. With the help of a young doctor Geetha, who is Nagaraj's daughter, and an old friend Raja, Shekar slowly regains his memory and mental equilibrium. He and Geetha soon fall in love. But Nagaraj has already arranged Geetha's marriage with someone else, so he opposes the lovers. When Nagaraj finds that Geetha and Shekar are adamant, he performs a surgery (lobotomy) on Shekar that puts him into a state of coma. Raja feels that death would be preferable to vegetative life and kills Shekar. He confronts Nagaraj, confesses to the euthanasia and tries to kill him for ruining Shekar's life, but Geetha suddenly kills her father before Raja can. She is later admitted into the same institution as a patient.

Cast 
Prabhu as Shekar
Saranya as Dr.Geetha
Lissy as Anita
Sarath Babu as Raja
Senthamarai as Nagaraj
Janagaraj as Vasu
Nassar as Babu
Sachu as Nurse Mary
Samikannu as mental patient
Kumarimuthu as mental patient<ref>{{Cite web |last=சாந்தி கணேஷ் |first=ஆ |date=22 September 2020 |title=அப்பாவுக்கு நடந்தது யாருக்கும் நடக்கக்கூடாது!" - எலிசபெத் குமரிமுத்து |trans-title="What happened to my father should not happen to anyone!" – Elizabeth Kumarimuthu |url=https://www.vikatan.com/lifestyle/relationship/actor-kumarimuthu-daughter-elizabeth-shares-memories-of-her-dad |url-status=live |archive-url=https://archive.today/20210507043043/https://www.vikatan.com/story-feed |archive-date=7 May 2021 |access-date=7 May 2021 |website=Ananda Vikatan |language=ta}}</ref>
Swaminathan as mental patient

 Production Manasukkul Mathappu was remade from the Malayalam film Thalavattam (1986), which was inspired by the 1975 film One Flew Over the Cuckoo's Nest  which in turn was an adaptation of the 1962 novel One Flew Over the Cuckoo's Nest by Ken Kesey.

 Soundtrack 
Soundtrack was composed by S. A. Rajkumar, with lyrics written by himself.

 Release and reception Manasukkul Mathappu was released on 24 June 1988. On 1 July 1988, The Indian Express wrote, "With some films you don't want to say much about the performances though they might be good or sort of as much as you want to write home about the bright idea the scenarist had of disposing of a heroine he wanted to kill by electrocuting her while she is playing the electric guitar or the masterstroke of the filmmaker in cutting from the shriek of the hero in the shock chamber to a happy times song-dance sequence till then obscured by the iron curtain of amnesia." Jeyamanmadhan of Kalki'' appreciated Prabhu's performance, and felt that though there was no newness in the songs, they were still worth listening to. Prabhu won the Cinema Express Award for Best Actor – Tamil at the 9th Cinema Express Awards.

References

External links 
 

1980s Tamil-language films
1988 films
Films based on American novels
Films scored by S. A. Rajkumar
Films set in psychiatric hospitals
Patricide in fiction
Tamil remakes of Malayalam films